Shaanxi Diesel Engine Heavy Industry, Co. Ltd. of Shaanxi, China is a major producer of diesel-powered electrical generators, high-speed prime movers for large-scale marine applications, and is one of China's key state enterprises for the production of such engines.

Parent Company
Shaanxi Diesel Engine Heavy Industry, Co. Ltd. is a subsidiary of China Shipbuilding Industry Corporation.

Diesel Engines
The company's large 150-series diesel engines produce between 98 and 1072 hp (73 and 800 kW).

In addition, their smaller 396-series engines are produced under license from MTU Friedrichshafen, and are intended for use in vehicles, oil production equipment, small marine applications, and the generation of power.

Shaanxi Diesel's stand-alone power generators are rated for 102 to 536 hp (76 to 400 kW).

They also produce engines under license for MAN Diesel.

The company also produces diesel propulsion engines for warships such as the Type 054A frigate, of which the design is licensed from SEMT Pielstick. The engine produced is the 16-cylinder PA6 STC.

Automotive Fuel Injection Systems
They are an aftermarket provider as well, producing 50 different types of injector pumps and nozzles.

Export Sales
At present, Shaanxi Diesel exports its products to more than 20 countries.

References

External links

Company profile at Bnet.com via Findarticles.com
Company profile at Goliath.com
Licensing page for MAN Diesel at Manbw.com

Marine engine manufacturers
Diesel engine manufacturers
Companies based in Shaanxi
Companies with year of establishment missing
Engine manufacturers of China